Gründlach is a river of Bavaria, Germany. It flows into the Regnitz south of Erlangen.

See also
List of rivers of Bavaria

References

Rivers of Bavaria
Erlangen-Höchstadt
Rivers of Germany